Macaria fissinotata, the hemlock angle, is a moth of the  family Geometridae. It is found in North America from Nova Scotia to Georgia, west to Kentucky, north to Ontario.

The wingspan is 22–25 mm. The moth flies from May to September and from May to July in Quebec.

Its Latin name fissinotata is composed of the Latin word "fissus" (meaning cleaved or split) and "notatus" (mark). This probably refers to the forewing's large spot which is often split into two.

The larvae feed on Tsuga and Picea species, as well as Abies balsamea.

External links
Bug Guide

Macariini
Moths of North America
Moths described in 1863